6446 may refer to:

 6-4-4-6, a Whyte notation classification of steam locomotive
 6446 Lomberg, a minor planet
 The year in the 7th millennium